{{Infobox television
| image              = Hastaqueeldineronossepare.jpg
| image_size         = 250
| genre              = Telenovela
| creator            = Emilio Larrosa
| based_on           = 
| developer          =
| writer             = 
| director           = 
| creative_director  = Ignacio Lebrija
| starring           = 
| music              = Carlos Páramo
| opentheme          = "Hasta que el dinero nos separe" by Pedro Fernández
| country            = Mexico
| language           = Spanish
| num_episodes       = 231
| executive_producer = Emilio Larrosa
| producer           = Arturo Pedraza
| cinematography     = Ángeles Márquéz
| editor             = 
| camera             = Multi-camera
| runtime            = 
| company            = Televisa
| distributor        = Televisa Internacional
| network            = Canal de las Estrellas
| picture_format     = NTSC (480i)
| audio_format       = Stereophonic sound
| first_aired        = 
| last_aired         = 
| preceded_by        = Un gancho al corazón
| followed_by        = Llena de amor
| related            = Hasta que la plata nos separe 
}}Hasta que el dinero nos separe is a Mexican telenovela premiered on Canal de las Estrellas on June 29, 2009, and concluded on May 16, 2010. The series is created and produced for Televisa by Emilio Larrosa, based on the Colombian telenovela Hasta que la plata nos separe written by Fernando Gaitán. It stars Pedro Fernández and Itatí Cantoral as the titular characters.

The series received several awards in the 28th TVyNovelas Awards for Best Telenovela of the Year, Best Actress, and Best Actor.

Plot
The main character is Rafael Medina; he meets Alejandra Álvarez del Castillo when he crashes in to her car and sends it over the side of the road. He takes her to a hospital where he tells the doctors he is her husband for fear of getting thrown in jail for causing the accident. However, the situation worsens when Alejandra's boyfriend, Marco, shows up at the hospital and has Rafael arrested. In exchange for his freedom, Rafael has to pay for the damage he caused, thus he is forced to find a job so that he is able to pay the outrageous sum of money.

Alejandra makes a deal with Rafael and hires him to work in Autos Siglo'' so he can pay her back. Rafael immediately falls in love with her, but he has a girlfriend Vicky who is determined to marry Rafael even though he might not feel the same. Lucky for her, she has two older brothers and her dad, who own and work in a butcher shop, often intimidating Rafael to make sure Vicky gets what she wants.

After a series of events, Alejandra and Rafael both realize that they are in love with each other. The most memorable events include a party in Juchitepec, their trip to Puerto Vallarta, Jalisco, and of course their daily interaction at Autos Siglo. Many try to keep them apart, especially Vicky and Marco. However, both Vicky and Marco have cheated on their significant others. Marco does not love Alejandra, but wants to marry her for her money and hacienda, which is one of the most beautiful in the country.

After several events, another woman, named Marian Celeste, makes her appearance and eventually falls in love with Rafael. She tries to make him fall in love with her; she even goes as far as to wear a sexy bikini to seduce Rafael and help him gain clients at Autos Siglo. After many problems, love triumphs as Rafael and Alejandra get married. Together they get back to the now recovered house of los Alvarez del Castillo, which had been lost as a side effect of one of Marco's schemes to keep Alejandra and Rafael apart, and Rafael serenades Alejandra with the song that brought them together in Juchitepec.

Cast

Main Cast
 Pedro Fernández as Rafael Medina Nuñez / Manuel Rivera 
 Itatí Cantoral as Lic. Alejandra Álvarez del Castillo Fernández
 Víctor Noriega as Lic. Marco Valenzuela "El Abogaducho"
 Luz Elena González as Victoria "Vicky" de la Parra "La Pajarita" 
 Carlos Cámara as Lic. Francisco Beltrán
 Sergio Corona as Don Jorge Álvarez del Castillo 
 Rodrigo Vidal as Jaime del Rincón  
 Lalo "El Mimo" as Vicente Chávez Méndez / Benjamín Rosas "La Rata"
 Sergio DeFassio as Ismael Dueñas "El Bebe"
 Harry Geithner as Edgar Marino "El Zorro" 
 Carlos Bonavides as Ramiro Jiménez "El Ay Dios Mío"
 Joana Benedek as Lic. Marian Celeste
 Frances Ondiviela as Rosaura Suárez De la Grana "La Casada"
 Diana Golden as Isabel Duarte "La Generala"
 Carlos Ignacio as Germán Ramírez Betancourt "El Teorico"
 Claudia Troyo as Susana Hadad "La Nonista"
 Érika García as Julieta Medina Nuñez
 Malillany Marín as Claudia Bermudez "La Buenota" 
 Héctor Sandarti as Nelson Jóse Ospina "El Dandy"
 Ana Bekoa as Rubí
 Alberto Loztín as Efraín Zetina
 Ferdinando Valencia as “El Rizos”
 Agustín Arana as Daniel Zepeda de los Monteros Quintana
 Gaby Ramirez as Ovidia “Ovi”
 Pedro Weber "Chatanuga" as Don Gastón de la Parra
 Norma Lazareno as Doña Rosario Álvarez del Castillo
 Leticia Perdigón as Doña Leonor Núñez de Medina
 Carmen Salinas as Doña Arcadia Alcalá Vda. del Rincón

Also as Main
Ana Bekoa as Rubí 
 Pablo Cheng as Bugambilia 
 Eric Prats as Samuel Ocampo “Sr. Cabello”
 Julio Vega as Amador 
 Rudy Casanova as Tadeo
 Ricardo Guerra as José Tomás Moreno “Pepeto”
 Roberto Mikel as Francisco de la Parra
 Fernando Manzano as Felipe de la Parra
 Ingrid Marie Rivera as Milagros Valtierra 
 Alfredo Alfonso as Enrique Quintana
 Anghel as Elvira Jimenez
 Marisela Arriola as Suegra de Jimenez
 Roberto Tello as Juan Tovar "El Trapito" 
 Sofia Tejeda as Azucena
Elizabeth Aguilar as Doña Dolores Sansores
 Horacio Beamonte as El Gran Brujo Mololongo 
 Marco Uriel as Lic. Humberto Urdiales
 José Antonio Iturriaga as Rendón
 Zoila Quiñonez as Ramirez's mother
Mario Casillas as Don Ignacio Rubiales “El Camarón
Gisella Aboumrad  as Janet

Special participation
 Maria Elisa Camargo as Monica Ledesma
 Alicia Machado as Karen Sandoval
 Pietro Vanucci as Guillermo Soler
 Rafael Origel as Frank, friend of Chavez
 Diana Herrera as Lic. Carmela Muñoz
 Raul Ochoa as Lic. Gomez
 Susana Diazayas as Cristina
 Giselle Aragon as Daughter of Alejandra and Rafael
 Christian Chávez as Sergio
 David Bisbal as himself
 Galilea Montijo as herself
 Chef Alfredo Oropeza as himself
 La Sonora Santanera featuring Margarita, la Diosa de la Cumbia as themselves
 Consuelo Duval as Rebeca Madariaga "La Leona" 
 Guadalupe Pineda as herself
 Lolita Ayala as herself
 Patricio Cabezut as himself
 Úrsula Prats as Manuela Olivares
 Jorge Arvizu as Isidoro Hernandez
 Alejandra Barros as Lic. Alicia Avila del Villar
 Sergio Mayer as Johnny Alpino “El Catrin”
 Lourdes Munguía as Laura Fernandez del Villar
 Ricardo Barona as Hernan Linares
 Manuel "Flaco" Ibáñez as Casimiro Gutierrez "El Guitierritos" 
 Luis Gimeno as Lic. Fernando Bernal
 Tania Vazquez as Roxana Ferrón García “Roxanita”
 Mauricio Islas as Edgardo Regino
 Jonathan Rosales as Fluffy Guzman
 Nahomi Salinas as La Jefa
 Ramón Valdés Urtiz as Germán
Fabiola Campomanes as Lola Sansores
Jorge Ortiz de Pinedo as Don Rafael Medina Santillán

Awards And Nominations

References

External links
 ESMAS: Hasta que el Dinero nos Separe (official site; in Spanish)
 Facebook: Hasta Que El Dinero Nos Separe (official Facebook page; in Spanish)
 Univision: Novelas y Series: Hasta que el dinero nos separe (in Spanish)
 Series Now: Hasta que el dinero nos Separe  (in English)

2009 telenovelas
2009 Mexican television series debuts
2010 Mexican television series endings
Mexican telenovelas
Televisa telenovelas
Mexican television series based on Colombian television series
Spanish-language telenovelas